Maḥmūd Pasīkhānī was the founder of the Nuqtavi movement in Iran, an offshoot of the Hurūfī movement. He was born in Pasikhān, Iran in Gīlān. Pasikhānī claimed he was the reincarnation of Muḥammad on a higher plane. He declared himself Mahdī in 1397.

See also 
Mahdi
Isma'ili
Sufism
Nāīmee
Nasīmee
Hurufiyya
Shi'a Islam
Nuktawiyya
Murād Mīrzā
Nuqta-yi Ula (Báb)
List of Ismaili imams
List of extinct Shia sects

References
Hamid Algar: Nuqtavi Encyclopedia of Islam, 1994, p. 114-117

Self-declared mahdi